Jayden Hodges (born 9 October 1993) is an Australian professional rugby league footballer who is the captain of the Mackay Cutters in the Queensland Cup.

Background
Born in Cairns, Queensland, Hodges is an Indigenous Australian and played his junior football for the Cairns Kangaroos, before being signed by the North Queensland Cowboys.

Hodges is the cousin of former Brisbane Broncos player Justin Hodges.

Playing career

Early career
In 2012 and 2013, Hodges played for the North Queensland Cowboys' NYC team. In August 2013, he signed a three-year contract with the Manly-Warringah Sea Eagles starting in 2014.

2013
In Round 25 of the 2013 NRL season, Hodges made his NRL debut for North Queensland against the Cronulla-Sutherland Sharks.

2014
In Round 17 of the 2014 NRL season, Hodges made his Manly Warringah debut against the Canterbury-Bankstown Bulldogs. After a season-ending injury to first grade hooker Matt Ballin against Penrith in Round 25, Hodges was called into the team for the final three games of the season, scoring his first NRL try in Manly's 17-18 sudden death Semi-final loss to Canterbury-Bankstown at the Sydney Football Stadium.

2015
Hodges spent the majority of 2015 playing for Manly's New South Wales Cup side. For his efforts he won the Bob Batty Best and Fairest Award for the New South Wales Cup side and was also named as the Players' Player. He also played in seven NRL games during the 2015 NRL season.

2016
Although Manly made the decision to release long time first grade hooker and dual premiership player Matt Ballin at the end of 2015, the club then signed former South Sydney premiership hooker Apisai Koroisau from Penrith and Ipswich Jets hooker Matt Parcell to three-year contracts with Hodges again facing the possibility of playing in the New South Wales Cup rather than the NRL. Hodges did gain selection to Manly's 2016 NRL Auckland Nines squad, but his tournament was ended when he was ruled out for the season after suffering a torn anterior cruciate ligament (ACL).

2017
Hodges signed a one year contract with the Mackay Cutters who play in the Queensland Cup competition. However, he suffered a season-ending injury in his first match of the season.

References

External links
Manly Warringah Sea Eagles profile

1993 births
Living people
Australian rugby league players
Indigenous Australian rugby league players
North Queensland Cowboys players
Manly Warringah Sea Eagles players
Rugby league hookers
Rugby league players from Cairns